Marcus Steegmann (born 4 February 1982) is a German football player for Viktoria Köln.

References

External links

 Marcus Steegmann Interview

1982 births
Living people
German footballers
1. FC Köln II players
Hamburger SV II players
Borussia Dortmund players
Borussia Dortmund II players
SpVgg Unterhaching players
VfR Aalen players
TuS Koblenz players
SV Darmstadt 98 players
FC Viktoria Köln players
Bundesliga players
3. Liga players
Association football forwards
Footballers from Cologne